Espionage is a British TV spy anthology series broadcast on the ITV network in the UK and on NBC in the United States for a single series from the autumn of 1963. Its US run lasted from October 2, 1963, until September 2, 1964.

Synopsis
Made from actual case histories, episodes used newsreel and documented narratives to show activities of spies from various countries as far back as the American Revolution and as recent as the Cold War. The 24 black-and-white episodes, each with a running time of 48 minutes, had no regular cast.

Guest cast
Featured guest stars included:
 Martin Balsam
 David Kossoff
 Dennis Hopper
 Patricia Neal
 Joan Hickson
 Patrick Troughton
 Billie Whitelaw
 Patrick Cargill
 Jill Bennett
 Millicent Martin
 Anthony Quayle – a real-life "spy" with the Special Operations Executive during World War II.

Many of the cast members were largely unknown in the United States when this series was first broadcast and some members would go on to fame in the US because of the exposure.

Production 
Herbert Hirschman and Herbert Brodkin were the producers. The theme music was composed and conducted by Malcolm Arnold.

The program was broadcast from 9 to 10 p.m. Eastern Time on Wednesday nights.

Episode list
This list is in NBC's airdate order.

References

External links
 CTA information
 

1960s British drama television series
1963 British television series debuts
1964 British television series endings
1960s British anthology television series
British drama television series
Espionage television series
Television series by ITC Entertainment
ITV television dramas
British military television series
NBC original programming
Black-and-white British television shows
English-language television shows
1960s American crime drama television series
American spy drama television series